Sabz or Sabez may refer to:
 Sabz, East Azerbaijan
 Sabz, Sistan and Baluchestan